

Technological institutes
Indian Institute of Technology Kanpur (IIT Kanpur)
Dr. Ambedkar Institute of Technology for Handicapped (AITH Kanpur)
Institute of Company Secretaries of India (ICSI kanpur)
Institute of Chartered Accountants of India (ICAI Kanpur)
National Sugar Institute (NSI)
University Institute of Engineering and Technology, Kanpur University (UIET Kanpur or IET Kanpur)
Kanpur Institute of Technology (KIT)
SRMS College of Engineering and Technology, Kanpur Lucknow Highway (SRMS CET)

Medical and allied colleges
Ganesh Shankar Vidyarthi Memorial Medical College (GSVM)

Universities

Chhatrapati Shahu Ji Maharaj University (CSJMU), formerly Kanpur University (KU)
Chandra Shekhar Azad University of Agriculture and Technology
Harcourt Butler Pravidhik Vishwavidyalaya

Others
DAV College, Kanpur
VSSD College, Kanpur
Christ Church College, Kanpur
Halim Muslim PG College
BND College, Kanpur
Dayanand Brajendra Swarup College

References 

 
Kanpur-related lists